The Esther Jensen is a gaff-rigged ketch built in 1939 in Denmark.

History

Built in 1939 in Denmark, the Esther Jensen was used as a fishing boat initially.

In 1992, she was bought by Theo van Tricht, and restored and modernised. She now sails in European and Polar waters as a sail training vessel, offering escorted sailing holidays. She is eligible to take part in The Tall Ships' Races organised by Sail Training International.

References

External links
Esther Jensen website 
Technical data

Tall ships of the Netherlands
Merchant ships of the Netherlands
Ships built in Denmark
1939 ships